Noël Ongley Tagart (24 December 1878 – 8 October 1913) was an English cricketer. He played for Gloucestershire between 1900 and 1901. Tagart was educated at Clifton College and Jesus College, Cambridge.

References

1878 births
1913 deaths
People educated at Clifton College
Alumni of Jesus College, Cambridge
English cricketers
Gloucestershire cricketers
People from Paddington
Cricketers from Greater London
Cambridge University cricketers
Marylebone Cricket Club cricketers